The Hogarth Press is a book publishing imprint of Penguin Random House that was founded as an independent company in 1917 by British authors Leonard Woolf and Virginia Woolf. It was named after their house in Richmond (then in Surrey and now in London), in which they began hand-printing books as a hobby during the interwar period.

Hogarth originally published the works of many members of the Bloomsbury group, and was at the forefront of publishing works on psychoanalysis and translations of foreign, especially Russian, works.

In 1938, Virginia Woolf relinquished her interest in the business and it was then run as a partnership by Leonard Woolf and John Lehmann until 1946, when it became an associate company of Chatto & Windus. In 2011, Hogarth Press was relaunched as an imprint for contemporary fiction in a partnership between Chatto & Windus in the United Kingdom and Crown Publishing Group in the United States, which had both been acquired by Random House.

History
Printing was a hobby for the Woolfs, and it provided a diversion for Virginia when writing became too stressful. The couple bought a handpress in 1917 for £19 (equivalent to about £1295 in 2018) and taught themselves how to use it. The press was set up in the dining room of Hogarth House, where the Woolfs lived, lending its name to the publishing company they founded. In July they published their first text, a book with one story written by Leonard and the other written by Virginia.

Between 1917 and 1946 the Press published 527 titles. It moved to Tavistock Square in 1924.

Series 

The Hogarth Press produced a number of publication series that were affordable as well as being attractively bound and printed, and usually commissioned from well known authors. These include the initial Hogarth Essays in three series 1924–1947 (36 titles), 
Hogarth Lectures on Literature (2 series 1927–1951), Merttens Lectures on War and Peace (8 titles 1927–1936), Hogarth Living Poets (29 titles 1928–1937), Day to Day Pamphlets (1930–1939), Hogarth Letters (12 titles 1931–1933) and World-Makers and World-Shakers (4 titles 1937).

The Essays were the first series produced by the press and include works by Virginia Woolf, Leonard Woolf and Gertrude Stein. Virginia Woolf's defence of modernism, Mr. Bennett and Mrs. Brown (1924) was the initial publication in the series. Cover illustrations were by Vanessa Bell.

The Letters are less well known, and are epistolary in form. Authors include E.M. Forster and Virginia Woolf. Woolf's A Letter to a Young Poet (1932), was number 8, and addressed to John Lehmann as an exposition on modern poetry. Cover illustrations were by John Banting. In 1933, the entire series was reissued as a single volume, and are available on the Internet Archive in a 1986 edition.

 A letter to Madam Blanchard, E. M. Forster (1931)
 A letter to an M.P. on disarmament, Robert Gascoyne-Cecil, 1st Viscount Cecil of Chelwood (1931)
 A letter to a sister, Rosamond Lehmann (1931)
 The French pictures: a letter to Harriet, Robert Mortimer and John Banting (1932)
 A letter from a black sheep, Francis Birrell (1932)
 A letter to W. B. Yeats, L. A. G. Strong (1932)
 A letter to a grandfather, Rebecca West (1933)
 A letter to a young poet, Virginia Woolf (1932)
 A letter to a modern novelist, Hugh Walpole (1932)
 A letter to an archbishop, J. C. Hardwick (1932)
 A letter to Adolf Hitler, Louis Golding (1932)
 A letter to Mrs. Virginia Woolf, Peter Quennell (1932)

Notable title history

Monday or Tuesday (1921) by Virginia Woolf, with woodcuts by Vanessa Bell
Jacob's Room (1922) by Virginia Woolf; the first of her novels published by The Hogarth Press
The Devils (1922) by Dostoyevsky – co-translated by Virginia Woolf
The Waste Land by T. S. Eliot (1924) – first UK book edition
The Common Reader (1925) by Virginia Woolf
Karn (1922) and Martha Wish-You-Ill (1926) – poetry by Ruth Manning-Sanders
Orlando (1928) by Virginia Woolf
Living (1929) by Henry Green
The Waves (1931) by Virginia Woolf
In a Province (1934) – first book by Laurens van der Post
What I Believe (1939) by E. M. Forster
Party Going (1939) by Henry Green
Twilight in Delhi (1940) by Ahmed Ali
Loving by Henry Green (1945)
The Standard Edition of the Complete Psychological Works of Sigmund Freud (1956–1974), in collaboration with Anna Freud
The Four Fundamental Concepts of Psychoanalysis (1977) by Jacques Lacan, his first published Seminar.

The Hogarth Shakespeare Project
In 2015 Hogarth Press began producing a series of modern retellings of William Shakespeare plays, known as the Hogarth Shakespeare Project, for which it hired a variety of authors:

 The Gap of Time (based on The Winter's Tale), Jeanette Winterson (published 2015)
 Shylock is my Name (based on The Merchant of Venice), Howard Jacobson (published 2016)
 Vinegar Girl (based on The Taming of the Shrew), Anne Tyler (published 2016)
 Hag-Seed (based on The Tempest), Margaret Atwood (published 2016)
 New Boy (based on Othello), Tracy Chevalier (published 2017)
 Dunbar (based on King Lear), Edward St Aubyn (published 2017)
 Macbeth (based on Macbeth), Jo Nesbo (published 2018)

References

Bibliography 

 
 Gaither, Mary E. "The Hogarth Press 1917–1946" pp. xvii–xxxiv in J. Howard Woolmer (1986), A checklist of the Hogarth Press 1917–1946, Woolmer Brotherson Ltd. .
 
 
 Kennedy, Richard. A Boy at the Hogarth Press (1972. Whittington Press.) Hesperus Press Ltd 
 
 
 Spater, George; Parsons, Ian A Marriage of True Minds: An Intimate Portrait of Leonard and Virginia Woolf (1977. London: J. Cape.) Harvest/HBJ paperback 
 Willis, J. H.  (1992), Leonard and Virginia Woolf as Publishers: The Hogarth Press, 1917–41, University Press of Virginia. .
 
 
 Woolmer, J. Howard. "Publications of The Hogarth Press" pp. 3–178 in J. Howard Woolmer (1986), A checklist of the Hogarth Press 1917–1946, Woolmer Brotherson Ltd. .
 Woolmer, J. Howard. A Checklist of the Hogarth Press, 1917–1938 (1976) [With a short history of the press by Mary E. Gaither] Woolmer/Brotherson, 1986, 250 p.:  (compare Hogarth Press Publications, 1917–1946 at Duke University Library that uses the numbering of the Woolmer publication)

External links
 The Modernist Archives Publishing Project - Digitised materials from the Hogarth Press archive, including editorial correspondence, publisher's ephemera, book dust jackets, plus author bios of Hogarth Press authors 
 A detailed account of the Hogarth Press at the Yale Modernism Lab
 The Bloomsbury Group and Hogarth Press Collection at the Victoria University Library at the University of Toronto which features all the Hogarth Press books hand-printed by Leonard and Virginia Woolf including many variant issues, bindings and proof copies. (Records for each item can be found in the University of Toronto Library Catalogue.)
 Archives of The Hogarth Press at Archives Hub
 The Hogarth Shakespeare Project Website

1917 establishments in England
Book publishing companies of the United Kingdom
British companies established in 1917
 
Media and communications in the London Borough of Richmond upon Thames
Organisations based in the London Borough of Richmond upon Thames
Publishing companies based in London
Publishing companies established in 1917
Random House
Richmond, London
Virginia Woolf